Catocala whitneyi, or Whitney's underwing, is a moth of the family Erebidae. The species was first described by G. M. Dodge in 1874. It is found in North America from North Dakota, Nebraska, and Kansas eastward through Wisconsin to Ohio and Tennessee. It has also been recorded as far west as Minnesota and Utah. In Canada, it has been found in Manitoba.

The wingspan is 45–50 mm. Adults are on wing from July to August in one generation depending on the location.

The larvae feed on Amorpha species.

References

External links
Oehlke, Bill. "Catocala whitneyi Dodge, 1874". The Catocala Website. Archived October 14, 2008.

Original description: Canadian Entomologist

whitneyi
Moths of North America
Moths described in 1874